Acrotheloidea is a superfamily of Discinid brachiopods, alternatively ascribed to the lingulids—for a discussion of discinid taxonomy, see Discinida.

The story goes that there's an evolutionary transition from Eoobolus through Pustulobolus and Bostfordia to Acrotretids.

Acrotheloids have an apical foramen.

References

Prehistoric animal superfamilies
Discinida